Satan and the Woman is a 1928 American silent drama film directed by Burton L. King and starring Claire Windsor, Cornelius Keefe and Vera Lewis.

Cast
 Claire Windsor as Judith Matheny 
 Cornelius Keefe as Edward Daingerfield 
 Vera Lewis as Mrs. Leone Daingerfield 
 Thomas Holding as Ellison Colby 
 James T. Mack as Dallam Colby 
 Edith Murgatroyd as Hetty Folinsbee 
 Madge Johnston as Clementine Atwood 
 Sybil Grove as One of The Three Graces 
 Lucy Donahue as One of The Three Graces 
 Blanche Rose as One of The Three Graces

References

Bibliography
 Munden, Kenneth White. The American Film Institute Catalog of Motion Pictures Produced in the United States, Part 1. University of California Press, 1997.

External links

1928 films
1928 drama films
Silent American drama films
Films directed by Burton L. King
American silent feature films
1920s English-language films
American black-and-white films
1920s American films